The world record progression 500 m speed skating women as recognised by the International Skating Union:

References
 Historical World Records. International Skating Union.
 

World 00500 women